The Decatur Historic District is a residential historic district in the Millikin Heights neighborhood of Decatur, Illinois. The district encompasses the city's historic Near West and Southwest neighborhoods and was formed beginning in the 1850s and continuing through the 1920s. Nearly all of the popular architectural styles from this period are represented in the district. A number of professional architects, including Frank Lloyd Wright, designed homes in the district, giving it exceptionally high-quality architecture. The earlier houses mainly have Italianate designs; several Gothic Revival buildings from this period are also included. The Queen Anne and Classical Revival styles were popular in houses built in the late 19th century, though Romanesque and Tudor Revival houses were also designed in this period. The early 20th century brought the district the Colonial Revival style and several independent styles associated with the more prominent architects such as Wright.

The district was added to the National Register of Historic Places on November 7, 1976.

References

Queen Anne architecture in Illinois
Colonial Revival architecture in Illinois
Neoclassical architecture in Illinois
Italianate architecture in Illinois
Buildings and structures in Decatur, Illinois
Historic districts on the National Register of Historic Places in Illinois
National Register of Historic Places in Macon County, Illinois